Sypharochiton is a genus of chitons in the family Chitonidae. Most species are endemic to the waters of New Zealand, except for Sypharochiton pelliserpentis which is found in both New Zealand and south-eastern Australia.

Species
 Sypharochiton aorangi (Creese & O'Neill, 1987)
 Sypharochiton pelliserpentis (Quoy and Gaimard, 1835)
 Sypharochiton sinclairi (Gray, 1843)
 Sypharochiton themeropis Iredale, 1914
 Sypharochiton torri (Suter, 1907)

References
 Powell A W B, New Zealand Mollusca, William Collins Publishers Ltd, Auckland, New Zealand 1979 

Chitonidae
Chiton genera
Marine molluscs of Oceania